Jeong Su-il is a South Korean historian, specializing in Silk Road history.

Life
Jeong Su-il was born in Longjing, Jilin, China, and migrated to North Korea in the 1960s. He was trained as a spy, travelled to Lebanon, Tunisia, Papua New Guinea, Malaysia, and Philippines, and obtained Lebanese and Filipino nationalities. In 1984, he entered South Korea under the disguise as Filipino researcher Mohammad Kansu, and worked at Dankook University. He was arrested in 1996 and released in 2000.

Education and Career
Jeong studied Arabic in Peking University and continued his studies in Cairo University. Later, he became a history professor at Dankook University. Currently, Jeong is the president of Korea Institute of Civilization Exchanges. Jeong had embarked on dozens of journeys along the Silk Road to study the cultural exchange. Major works include A History of Trans-Civilizational Exchanges (2002) and The Cyclopedia of Silk Road (2013).

Writings
왕오천축국전 (학고재, 2004)
 History of Exchanges between the Silla Dynasty and the West (of China) in 1992
 The East and the West in the World in 1995
 The Elementary Arabic in 1995
 The Silkroadology in 2001
 The History of Exchanges among the Ancient Civilizations in 2001
 The Study of the History of the Civilizational Exchanges
 The Civilization of Islam in 2002
 Silk Road, the Route of Civilization in 2002
 Walking on the
 The World in Korea (2 volumes) in 2005
 Journey of the Silk Road Civilization in 2006
 The Life and Religion of the Silk Road in 2006
Encyclopaedia of Silk Road in 2013

Translations 
Journey The Travels (الرحلة, Rihla) of Ibn Battuta in 2001
The Eastern Parts of the World Described of Odoric de Pordenone
An account of travel to the five Indian kingdoms (Wang ocheonchukguk jeon) by Hyecho
Cathay and the way thither of Sir Henry Yule

References

1934 births
Living people
Historians of Korea
Korean people of Manchukuo
Chinese people of Korean descent
South Korean historians
North Korean spies
North Korean defectors
South Korean emigrants to North Korea
Peking University alumni
Cairo University alumni
People from Yanbian